Lassay-sur-Croisne is a city and town in the Loir-et-Cher department in the administrative region of Centre-Val de Loire, France.

Population

See also
Communes of the Loir-et-Cher department

References

Communes of Loir-et-Cher